The World Saxophone Congress is a festival gathering approximately 1000 saxophonists and other musicians from all over the world. It is held every three years at a different congress centre in a different country and focuses primarily (although not exclusively) on the performance of classical saxophone music.

The Congress presents an opportunity to meet saxophonists from many countries and to listen to various concerts and performances of saxophone soloists, chamber ensembles, big bands and symphony orchestras that run simultaneously throughout the day in different halls of the congress centre. Each of the five days is concluded by an evening concert of the orchestra and outstanding international soloists. It is also convened with the purpose of presenting the advancements of music production and distribution as well as innovations in instrument-making and equipment.

The seventeenth and most recent World Saxophone Congress, known as SaxOpen, was held between 9 and 14 July 2015 in Strasbourg France. The eighteenth World Saxophone Congress was slated to be held in 2018 in Zagreb, Croatia.

Origins
The World Saxophone Congress was conceived by Paul Brodie (1934 - 2007) and co-founded in 1969 with Eugene Rousseau (b. 1932), holding their first Congress in Chicago. Eugene Rousseau writes:
"The most memorable time I spent with Paul [Brodie] was our December, 1968 meeting in Chicago. It was during this meeting that he articulated his vision of the establishment of a world saxophone congress. It came to fruition in conjunction with the Midwest Band Clinic during the following year. The World Saxophone Congress, thanks to the dream of Paul Brodie, had become established."
Paul Brodie himself recalls:
"I went to an accordion congress in Toronto and I was so impressed that I thought "wouldn’t it be great to do this for the saxophone".... The next year I came back to the Midwest Band Clinic. I had written an article for Instrumentalist Magazine - "Towards a World Saxophone Congress", and I was invited to a meeting of the executive committee and they offered me the grand ballroom of the Sherman House Hotel for 16 December 1969. I asked other saxophone players to help me and nobody responded. I called Eugene Rousseau because I had met him in Seattle at a music convention.... So we met in September 1969 at the Holiday Inn at O’Hare Airport in Chicago and we stayed up all night designing the program and started to call everybody the next morning and by the time we held the first congress we thought that maybe 200 people would show up. Well over 500 saxophonists showed up."

In 1981, a 7-member International Saxophone Committee (in French, Comite International du Saxophone, CIS). was set up to help organise the Congress.

Performers and participants
Congress performers/participants have included Frederick Hemke, Eugene Rousseau, Donald Sinta, Patrick Meighan, Bruce Faulconer, One O'Clock Lab Band, Lee Patrick, Ronald Caravan, Paul Brodie, Lin Chien-Kwan, Roger Greenberg, Debra Richtmeyer, Kyle Horch, the Scottish Saxophone Ensemble, the National Saxophone Choir of Great Britain, and Brian Brown

Venues
The World Saxophone Congress has been held in:

References

Bibliography
Richard Ingham, The Cambridge Companion to the Saxophone, Cambridge University Press, 1998, 
Thomas Liley, Paul Brodie, Eugene Rousseau, A brief history of the World Saxophone Congress: 1969-2000, World Saxophone Congress, Published 2003, 42 pages

External links
 12th World Saxophone Congress, (Montreal, 2000)
 XIII. World Saxophone Congress (Minneapolis, 2003) at Archive.org
 XIV. World Saxophone Congress (Ljubljana, 2006) at Archive.org
 XV. World Saxophone Congress (Bangkok, 2009) at Archive.org
 XVI World Saxophone Congress (St Andrews 2012) | Official Facebook page
 XVII World Saxophone Congress (Strasbourg 2015) Official Facebook page
 International Saxophone Committee, organisers of World Saxophone Congress
 World Saxophone Congress video clips via Google Video

Saxophone organizations
Music conferences